The Bangladesh Today is a national daily newspaper in Bangladesh, published from Dhaka in the English language. It started on 26 January 2002. The current circulation is 22,500.

See also
 List of newspapers in Bangladesh

References

External links

2002 establishments in Bangladesh
English-language newspapers published in Bangladesh
Daily newspapers published in Bangladesh
Newspapers established in 2002
Newspapers published in Dhaka